Malayan United Industries Berhad (MUI) was founded in 1960, and owned by Khoo Kay Peng. The main businesses of the group includes retailing, hotels, food and confectionery, financial services, property, travel and tourism. The group has business presence in the UK, Continental Europe, the US, Canada, the UAE, Malaysia, Thailand, Australia, Hong Kong, China, Japan and Singapore.

Some of the major company names in MUI group includes Metrojaya Berhad, Laura Ashley plc, Corus Hotels and Network Foods.  The company also purchased evangelist Jim Bakker's bankrupt Heritage USA Christian resort and theme park in Fort Mill, South Carolina, in 1991 and operated it for a number of years under its subsidiary, Regent Carolina Corporation, before selling the property in the mid-2000s. In recent years, MUI relocated Laura Ashley's United States corporate headquarters to a building at the former Heritage USA site that once served as  Jim Bakker's PTL ministry headquarters.

Subsidiaries

Retailing
Metrojaya Berhad
Laura Ashley Holdings plc

Financial services 
PM Securities Sdn Bhd

Hotels
Corus Hotels UK
Corus Hotels Kuala Lumpur
Corus Paradise Resort Port Dickson

Properties
MUI Properties

Food and confectionery
Network Foods Group
Network Foods Malaysia

External links
 Official website

Companies listed on Bursa Malaysia
1960 establishments in Malaya
Conglomerate companies established in 1960
Multinational companies headquartered in Malaysia
Conglomerate companies of Malaysia